Sir Arthur Leigh Bolland Ashton  (1897–1983) was a British art historian and director of the Victoria and Albert Museum.

Early life
Ashton was the son of the jurist A. J. Ashton KC, a court recorder in Manchester. He was educated at Winchester College and Balliol College, Oxford.

Career
In 1945, he was appointed director of the Victoria and Albert Museum, taking over from Eric Maclagan.

Ashton retired in 1955, and was succeeded by Trenchard Cox.

Personal life
In 1952, he married the fashion editor and academic Madge Garland, in a marriage of convenience. They divorced in 1962, and had no children.

References

1897 births
1983 deaths
Directors of the Victoria and Albert Museum
Fellows of the Society of Antiquaries of London
People educated at Winchester College
Alumni of Balliol College, Oxford